The 2017 China International Suzhou was a professional tennis tournament played on hard courts. It was the third edition of the tournament which was part of the 2017 ATP Challenger Tour. It took place in Suzhou, China from October 23 to October 29, 2017.

Singles main-draw entrants

Seeds

 Rankings are as of 16 October 2017.

Other entrants
The following players received wildcards into the singles main draw:
  Gao Xin
  Sun Fajing
  Xia Zihao
  Zeng Shi Hong

The following players received entry from the qualifying draw:
  Riccardo Ghedin
  Miliaan Niesten
  Sidharth Rawat
  Te Rigele
The following player received entry as a lucky loser:
  Bai Yan

Champions

Singles

  Miomir Kecmanović def.  Radu Albot 6–4, 6–4.

Doubles

  Gao Xin /  Sun Fajing def.  Gong Maoxin /  Zhang Ze 7–6(7–5), 4–6, [10–7].

2017 ATP Challenger Tour
2017 in Chinese sport